Charles Marohn (born  1973) is an American author, land-use planner, municipal engineer, and the founder and president of Strong Towns, an organization which advocates for the development of dense towns and the restructuring of suburbia.

Early life and education
Charles L. Marohn Jr grew up in Baxter, Minnesota on a small farm.

He graduated from Brainerd High School in 1991. Marohn received a Bachelor of Science in Civil Engineering and a Masters in Urban and Regional Planning from the University of Minnesota. In 2000 he became a licensed professional engineer (PE) in the state of Minnesota.

He has since faced scrutiny by the state licensing board after an engineer from South Dakota reported Marohn for failing to renew his license in the mandated time frame, yet still calling himself a PE. Marohn admits to missing the license renewal deadline but acted quickly upon being made aware of the situation and addressed the oversight. Marohn viewed this action as a limitation upon his first amendment rights because of his critical statements made about the practices of traffic engineering, as well as his disapproval of civil engineers who he views as doing little to protect human life on roads.

Strong Towns

Marohn started Strong Towns as a blog in 2008. He was frustrated with projects he was working on which he believed were actively harming the places they were supposed to help. As he gained many readers, he realized there was a need for an organization that advocated the principles he espoused. Strong Towns became a non-profit organization to "support a model of growth that allows America’s towns to become financially strong and resilient".

Marohn believes that post World War II suburban development has been a failure, due to it being inherently economically unsustainable. He posits that low-density communities do not produce the tax revenue necessary to cover either their current services or the long-term costs of maintaining and replacing their services, and that suburbs are very difficult to adapt to an efficient, dense model because they were built as fully developed places.

In 2011, he coined the word "stroad," a street/road hybrid, which has become popular among urbanists and planners. According to Marohn, stroads are the "futon" of transportation alternatives. "Where a futon is an uncomfortable couch that also serves as an uncomfortable bed, a STROAD is an auto corridor that does not move cars efficiently while simultaneously providing little in the way of value capture."

In late 2015, Marohn participated in a White House conference on rural placemaking.

Personal life
Marohn lives with his wife and two daughters in Brainerd, Minnesota.

Publications

Books

A World Class Transportation System: Transportation Finance for a New Economy (2014)

See also
Urban consolidation
Urban growth boundary
Urban resilience
New Urbanism

References

External links
Strong Towns Website
Writings on Resilience
Building more roads won't help fix America's economy

University of Minnesota College of Science and Engineering alumni
American writers
Living people
Year of birth missing (living people)
American urban planners
Humphrey School of Public Affairs alumni